Kim Kyong-hwa (born March 28, 1986) is a North Korean football (soccer) player who can play as either midfielder or forward. Her club team is 4.25 Sports Team and she is an established international player.

History

Born into an ordinary office worker’s family in Sinpho, she began to learn football at the age of 10.
She made her international debut at Universiad in 2003.
She unfolded a thrilling scoring scene in the first match played against the German team by dint of a powerful mid-and-long-range shot and grabbed the attention of spectators in the following games with fast and accurate assists and electrifying midfield shots, thus making a big contribution to her team’s win. 
Playing at the April 25 Sports Club afterwards, she showed off her remarkable skills in different domestic and international games and earned the title of Merited Athlete.  
As a member of the national junior women’s football team, she achieved success in the third Asian junior women’s football championships and positively contributed to the team’s triumph at the world junior women’s football championships by displaying her high spirit of collectivism and physical and technical prowess she had honed through training.
In the women’s soccer game of the 15th Asian Games, Kim Kyong Hwa was instrumental in the DPRK’s another winning of Asian championship as she cracked a breathtaking midfield shot and gave her teammates solid scoring chances. 
Afterwards she made nice plays at several international games including the 16th Asian women’s football championships and scored decisive goals in the matches against the US and Nigerian teams at the 5th world women’s football championships to greatly contribute to her team’s advance to the quarter-finals.

International goals

References

External links
 Profile at FIFA.com

1986 births
Living people
North Korean women's footballers
2007 FIFA Women's World Cup players
Olympic footballers of North Korea
Footballers at the 2008 Summer Olympics
Women's association football midfielders
Women's association football forwards
Asian Games medalists in football
Footballers at the 2006 Asian Games
Footballers at the 2010 Asian Games
North Korea women's international footballers
Asian Games gold medalists for North Korea
Asian Games silver medalists for North Korea
Medalists at the 2006 Asian Games
Medalists at the 2010 Asian Games